Fool's Garden is the first studio album by the rock band Fool's Garden. It was released in 1991. The album is one of two records where singer Peter Freudenthaler and guitarist Volker Hinkel share lead vocals equally. The album is dedicated to John Winston Lennon.

Track listing
Music & lyrics by Volker Hinkel, otherwise stated.
 "Awakenings" (4:34)
 "Man In A Cage" (3:42) (Hinkel, Claus-Dieter Wissler)
 "Scared" (1:24)
 "Careless Games" (3:58)
 "Sandy" (5:49) (Peter Freudenthaler)
 "One Way Out" (6:34) (Hinkel - music, Hinkel & Wissler - lyrics)
 "Cry Baby Cry" (Lennon, McCartney) (2:29)
 "Spirit Of The Disappeared" (4:22) (Hinkel, Wissler)
 "Lena" (4:50) (Hinkel - music, Freudenthaler - lyrics)
 "No Flowers By Request" (2:24)
 "Tell Me Who I Am" (3:09) (Freudenthaler)
 "The Part Of The Fool" (4:23)
 "You're Not Forgotten" (2:43)

Singles
 "Tell Me Who I Am / Careless Games" (double A-sided single released in 1991)

Musicians
 Volker Hinkel: guitars, keyboards, vocals, harmonica, additional drums, bass on tracks 2, 4 & 11, accordion on track 4, strings arrangement on track 7.
 Peter Freudenthaler: vocals and keyboards on tracks 5, 9 & 11, backing vocals on tracks 2 & 4.
 Bernhard Gail: solo guitar on tracks 9 & 12; backing vocals on track 4.
 Thomas Feucht: bass on track 1, 10 & 12.
 Ralf Gehring: acc. guitar on track 10.
 Andy Gail: mandolin on track 4.
 Nicole Freudenthaler: backing vocals on track 13.
 Roland Acht: drums.

1991 albums
Fools Garden albums